Don White (June 24, 1928 – April 29, 2016) was an American stock car racing from Keokuk, Iowa. He won two USAC Stock Car championships in the 1960s and was the series' winningest driver. White also had 24 starts in the NASCAR Grand National / Winston Cup series between 1954 and 1972 with 12 top-ten and 7 top-five finishes. At his death in 2016, he was the oldest living winner in ARCA history. He also won three IMCA championships: 1954, 1955 and 1958.

Racing career
White started his first national race in 1949. This IMCA race happened at Cedar Rapids, Iowa; he was second place before retiring because of mechanical problems. White won IMCA championships in 1954, 1955, and 1958. By the time that he ended IMCA racing in 1958, he had won at every track on the circuit. White's biggest competitor in IMCA was his brother-in-law Ernie Derr.

He moved to the USAC Stock Car series in 1959. His national racing career ended at a USAC Stock Car race at Milwaukee on August 28, 1983.

White won the most races in USAC Stock Car history. He had 53 wins and A. J. Foyt was second with 41. In a mid-2015 interview on ARCA's website, he said "I think I liked Milwaukee as well as any place. Won 14 or 15 there, so I'd say that was my favorite. The Milwaukee Journal Sentinel cited in his obituary that he was the winningest driver in major races at the track.

Death
White died on April 29, 2016 at age 89. Foyt reacted to his death by saying, "Don White was a good racer, real fair because he never did anything dirty, and real smooth. He always had beautiful equipment and his cars handled real well. He was a super guy."

Legacy and honors
White was named to the USAC Hall of Fame in 2013.

References

External links
 

1928 births
2016 deaths
People from Keokuk, Iowa
Racing drivers from Iowa
NASCAR drivers
ARCA Menards Series drivers
USAC Stock Car drivers